MBI may refer to:

MBI (Michigan Biotechnology Institute), a non-profit research accelerator
Machaneh Bonim in Israel, a tour of Israel by Habonim Dror
Management buy-in, of a large interest in a company
Maslach Burnout Inventory, a scale for burnout syndrome
Master of Business Informatics
Mathematical Biosciences Institute
Mbeya Airport (IATA code), Tanzania
MBI Publishing Company, publishers in Saint Paul, Minnesota, part of The Quarto Group
Metropolitan Bureau of Investigation, Florida, US
Mild behavioral impairment
 Mississippi Bureau of Investigation, an investigation agency in the state of Mississippi under the Mississippi Highway Patrol
Moody Bible Institute
mbi.is, the website for the Icelandic daily newspaper Morgunblaðið

See also
MB1, athletic shoe by Big Baller Brand